Linda Cooper may refer to:

 Linda Cooper (politician), Auckland councillor
 Linda Cooper (diver) (born 1944), American Olympic platform diver